Otto Aasen (1 January 1894 – 20 October 1983) was a Norwegian Nordic skier.

He was born in Fåberg, but moved to Rjukan in 1916. He spent his working career at Norsk Hydro in Rjukan from 1916 to 1964.

He won the Nordic combined at the Holmenkollen ski festival in 1917 and 1918. For his Nordic combined victories, Aasen shared the Holmenkollen medal in 1919 with Thorleif Haug. Aasen also competed in ski jumping, and won a silver medal in the individual large hill at the 1926 FIS Nordic World Ski Championships in Lahti. He also competed in cross-country skiing on a national level.

References

1894 births
1983 deaths
Holmenkollen medalists
Holmenkollen Ski Festival winners
Norwegian male Nordic combined skiers
Norwegian male ski jumpers
People from Rjukan
Place of death missing
FIS Nordic World Ski Championships medalists in ski jumping
Sportspeople from Vestfold og Telemark
20th-century Norwegian people